Sandor Martin Clemente (born 22 August 1993) is a Spanish professional boxer who has held the European super-lightweight title since 2019. As of October 2021, he is ranked as the world's sixth-best active super-lightweight by BoxRec, and eighth by the Transnational Boxing Rankings Board.

Professional career
Martin made his professional debut on 8 October 2011, scoring a third-round technical knockout (TKO) victory over Armen Hovsepyan at the Pabellón del Bon Pastor in Barcelona, Spain.

After compiling a record of 34–2 (12 KOs) he faced Andrea Scarpa for the vacant European super-lightweight title on 27 July 2019 at the Pabellón Francisco Calvo in Barcelona. Martin captured the European title by stoppage via ninth-round corner retirement (RTD). At the time of the stoppage he was ahead on all three judges' scorecards at 90–81.

Martin went on to defend his title twice before taking on former four-division world champion Mikey Garcia on 16 October 2021 in Fresno, California. Despite being a big underdog, Martin upset the odds by prevailing as the victor by majority decision, with scores of 95–95, and 97–93 twice in his favor.

Professional boxing record

References

External links

Living people
1993 births
Spanish male boxers
Boxers from Barcelona
Light-welterweight boxers
Southpaw boxers
European Boxing Union champions
20th-century Spanish people
21st-century Spanish people